Guilherme Campos (born 24 May 1955) is a Brazilian rower. He competed in the men's coxless pair event at the 1976 Summer Olympics.

References

1955 births
Living people
Brazilian male rowers
Olympic rowers of Brazil
Rowers at the 1976 Summer Olympics
Place of birth missing (living people)